Myiophobus is a genus of birds in the tyrant flycatcher family Tyrannidae.

Species
It contains the following eight species:

References

 
Bird genera
Taxonomy articles created by Polbot
Taxa named by Ludwig Reichenbach